It's Good to Be Alive is a 1974 American television film about baseball player Roy Campanella of the Brooklyn Dodgers. It was first aired on CBS on 22 February 1974. Based in part on his 1960 autobiography of the same name, it explores his role in integrating baseball, his own professional rise, and the physical and emotional work of recovery he had to undergo after the devastating 1958 auto accident that left him paralyzed from the shoulders down. One of the scariest scenes involved a fly, who flew into the hospital window, frightening Roy, who screamed, sending the doctors, who swatted the fly to death. The film made a few changes to the story, where Ruthie can no longer stand taking care of Roy, resulting in separation and divorce, in 1958, when it really happened in 1960. The moving finale involved Roy, making an appearance at the LA Coliseum, in a wheelchair, receiving a standing ovation, after making a speech.

Cast 
 Paul Winfield - Roy Campanella
 Louis Gossett Jr. - Sam Brockington, his physical therapist 
 Ruby Dee - Ruthe Campanella, his wife
 Ramon Bieri - Walter O'Malley
 Joe De Santis - Roy Campanella's father 
 Ty Henderson - David Campanella
 Ketty Lester - Roy Campanella's mother
 Julian Burton - Dr. Rusk
 Lloyd Gough - Surgeon
 Eric Woods - Roy Campanella as a Boy
 Len Lesser - Man at Accident
 Roy Campanella - Himself
 Roxie Files - Herself
Note: Both Roy and Roxie are shown in real life at the end of the film.

References

External links 

1970s biographical films
American television films
American baseball films
1974 television films
1974 films
Biographical films about sportspeople
Cultural depictions of baseball players
Films about paraplegics or quadriplegics
Metromedia Producers Corporation films
Films set in the 1950s
1970s American films